Tatran Liptovský Mikuláš is a Slovak football club, playing in the town of Liptovský Mikuláš.

History
The club was formed on 22 June 1934, following the example of some Liptovský municipalities and the municipality of Okoličné. The meeting consisted of many football enthusiasts from the community and Ján Devečka who officially declared the establishment of the football club.

The first elected chairman was JUDr. Sterllinger, who donated from his own private property the  Pšaninách meadow (where today stands a dairy) on which to create a football field, which was the club's home until 1972.

The club's first football match was a friendly game against neighbouring ŠK Smrečany, taking place on 15 July 1934, the result ended 8–0 for the home team. The game was attended by more than 500 spectators and the match was officiated by referee Michal Vala.

Honours

Domestic
 Slovak Second Division (1993–)
  Winners (1): 2020-21 (Promoted)
 Slovak Third Division (1993–)
  Winners (1): 2006 (Promoted)
 Slovak Cup (1961–)
 Quarter–finals 2017–18

Affiliated club
The following club is currently affiliated with MFK Tatran Liptovský Mikuláš:
  MŠK Žilina (2012–present)
  Kim Hee Tae Football Center Seoul (2020–present)

 Current squad As of 8 February 2023.For recent transfers, see List of Slovak football transfers winter 2022-23.

On loan

Staff
Current technical staffAs of 6 March 2023''

Club officials

Notable players 
The following former or current notable players had international caps for their respective countries. Players whose name is listed in bold represented their countries while playing for Tatran Liptovský Mikuláš.

 Erik Jendrišek
 Tomáš Malec
 Martin Polaček

Managerial history

 Ján Karaffa (−2013)
 Roman Vavrovič (2013)
 Jozef Škrlík (2013)
 Vladimír Goffa (2013–2014)
 Karol Praženica (2015)
 Juraj Sabol (2015)
 Anton Šoltis (2015)
 Jozef Kostelník (2015-2016)
 Juraj Sabol (2016)
 Jozef Majoroš (2016–2017)
 Jozef Šino (2017)
 Jozef Kukulský (2017-2018)
 Štefan Zaťko (2019–2020)
 Marek Petruš (2020– June 2022)
 Jozef Kostelník (June 2022–Nov 2022)
 Marek Fabuľa (Nov 2022-Feb 2023)

References

External links 

 Official website 

 
Association football clubs established in 1934
1934 establishments in Slovakia